Harvey Thomas was an American luthier who built a number of distinctive guitars in the 1960s.

Thomas was based in Kent, Washington, where he built guitars apparently uninfluenced by any other guitar builder. It included a cross-shaped guitar (called the Maltese), a triangular one (the Mandarin), and "the deranged mutations of the Mod and the Riot King." Thomas custom-built guitars as well, both electric and acoustic, including a number of enormous hollow-body guitars.

External links
 Biography at HistoryLink
 Lord Of The Strings: Guitar Wizard Harvey Thomas And His Infernal Music Machines

References

Guitar makers
American luthiers
People from Kent, Washington